The Indus Gorge is formed by the Indus River as it skirts the Nanga Parbat massif, the western anchor of the Greater Himalayas, and before it debouches into the plains of Punjab in Pakistan. The massive amounts of erosion due to the Indus River following the capture and rerouting through that area is thought to bring middle and lower crustal rocks to the surface. Gilgit is the westernmost tributary of the Indus River.

See also

 Geology of the Himalayas
 Rigvedic rivers

References 

Indus River